St David's Park is a park in Hobart, Tasmania. It is bounded by Davey Street, Salamanca Place and Sandy Bay Road. St David's Park contains Hobart's original burial ground, and the first Lieutenant Governor, David Collins, is buried there.

References

Landmarks in Hobart
Tourist attractions in Hobart
Geography of Hobart
Parks in Tasmania